Aeterna may refer to:

 Aeterna (TV series), a 2022 Russian TV series
 Aeterna (video game series), a video game series whose first game released in 2021
 Aeterna, a designer typeface created in 1927 by Ludwig & Mayer